The 2019–20 Marist Red Foxes men's basketball team represented Marist College in the 2019–20 NCAA Division I men's basketball season. The Red Foxes, led by second-year head coach John Dunne, played their home games at the McCann Arena in Poughkeepsie, New York as members of the Metro Atlantic Athletic Conference. They finished the season 7–23, 6–14 in MAAC play to finish in last place. They lost in the first round of the MAAC tournament to Niagara 54–56.

Previous season

The Marist Red Foxes finished the 2018–19 season 12–19 overall, 7–11 in MAAC play to finish in eighth place. As the No. 8 seed in the 2019 MAAC tournament, they were defeated by No. 9 seed Saint Peter's in the first round 68–71 in overtime.

Roster 

Jan. 4, 2020 – Sophomore guards Darius Hines and Matt Turner were dismissed after violating team rules.

Schedule and results

|-
!colspan=12 style="background:#B31B1B; color:#FFFFFF;"| Regular season

|-
!colspan=12 style="background:#B31B1B; color:#FFFFFF;"| MAAC tournament
|-

|-

References

Marist Red Foxes men's basketball seasons
Marist Red Foxes
Marist Red Foxes men's basketball
Marist Red Foxes men's basketball